The Archaeological Museum of Sparta, founded in 1875, is a museum in Sparta, Greece that houses thousands of artifacts from the ancient Acropolis of Sparta and the rest of the municipality of Laconia. It is one of Greece's oldest archaeology museums.

The collection's pieces date from the Neolithic to the late Roman era.

History

The museum is one of Greece's oldest archaeology museums. Years after its opening, it was largely neglected with most of its pieces currently stored in warehouses.

In July 2020, the Greek Minister of Culture and Sports Lina Mendoni approved plans to construct a new Archaeological Museum of Sparta and renovate the existing museum. The initiative included significant funding and promotion from the Stavros Niarchos Foundation.

Collections
In the museum are housed finds from excavations around the prefecture of Lakonia, provided that they are not exposed in collections of the archaeological museum Gythion or Neapolis.
Room I: Stelae of Roman years.  
Room II: Finds from the shrine of Artemis Orthia. 
Room III: Monumental sculpture and portraiture of Roman era. 
Room IV: Prehistoric finds from the wider region of Lakonia.
Room V: Samples of Roman mosaics.
Room VI: Architectonic parts of Apollo temple in Amyclae, that constitute also the more major department of collection
Room VII: Finds of Lakonian sculpture.

References

External links
Hellenic Ministry of Culture and Tourism / in Greek
www.planetware.com

Sparta
Sparta